James Stanton Keck (September 11, 1897 – January 20, 1951) was an American football player, coach, and college athletics administrator. He attended The Kiski School and went on to play college football at Princeton University as a tackle and guard. Keck was selected as an All-American in 1920 and in 1921. Keck served as the head football coach at Norwich University in Northfield, Vermont from 1942 to 1946 and Waynesburg College—now known as Waynesburg University—in Waynesburg, Pennsylvania from 1947 to 1950, compiling a career college football coaching record of 23–26–4. He was inducted into the College Football Hall of Fame as a player in 1959.

Death
Keck died on January 20, 1951, after suffering a stroke at Western Pennsylvania Hospital in Pittsburgh. He had transferred there five days earlier from Greene Country Memorial Hospital, to which he was admitted the previous month with high blood pressure.

Head coaching record

References

External links
 
 
 

1897 births
1951 deaths
American football guards
American football tackles
Cleveland Indians (NFL 1923) players
Norwich Cadets football coaches
Princeton Tigers football coaches
Princeton Tigers football players
Waynesburg Yellow Jackets athletic directors
Waynesburg Yellow Jackets football coaches
All-American college football players
College Football Hall of Fame inductees
People from Greensburg, Pennsylvania
Coaches of American football from Pennsylvania
Players of American football from Pennsylvania